George Francis William Child Villiers, 10th Earl of Jersey (born 5 February 1976), known professionally as William Villiers, is a British nobleman and peer of the Villiers family. He is a former film producer, actor and writer. He is currently Director of Intellectual Property for HandMade Films.

He is the heir-general of Ferdinando Stanley, 5th Earl of Derby, a great-grandson of Mary, Duchess of Suffolk. If Edward Seymour, Lord Beauchamp, son of Lady Katherine Grey, was illegitimate (as was questioned during his lifetime), Stanley would have been the senior qualified heir under the Will of Henry VIII of England, and thus he and his descendants, including Child Villiers, could be considered as claimants to the throne of England.

Education and career
Jersey is the eldest son of guitarist George Child Villiers, Viscount Villiers, and his second wife, Sacha (née Valpy), and was educated at St. Michael's School, Jersey, until the age of 8, then Mount House School, Tavistock, Devon; Canford School, Wimborne, Dorset; Nene College (now Northampton University); and Birmingham School of Speech and Drama. On the death of his father on 19 March 1998, he was briefly styled Viscount Grandison (in accordance with the family's tradition whereby each heir is alternately styled Viscount Villiers and then Viscount Grandison). He succeeded his grandfather as 10th Earl of Jersey in August of that year and took his seat in the House of Lords in 1999, shortly before the reformation of the House.

Family seat
However, the property was later withdrawn from the agents' listings.

Marriage and issue
On 16 August 2003, the Earl of Jersey married Marianne Simonne de Guelle, daughter of Peter and Jeannette de Guelle, in St Martin de Grouville, Jersey. They have four children:
 Lady Mia Adriana Marie Rose Child Villiers (b. 28 December 2006)
 Lady Amelie Natasha Sophia Child Villiers (b. 14 April 2008)
 Lady Evangeline Antonia Adela Child Villiers (b. 9 February 2011)
 George Henry William Child Villiers, Viscount Villiers (b. 1 September 2015).

He is a second cousin of actor Bart Ruspoli.

Filmography
Jack Says (2008) Executive Producer (completed)
London: The Greatest City (2004) (TV) .... Ben Johnsson
Four (2002) (TV) .... Brett and also Writer and Television producer
The Long Night (2002) (V) .... Geoffrey and also Executive Producer

Ancestry

Notes

References

External links 

1976 births
Living people
20th-century English nobility
21st-century English nobility
21st-century English male actors
Jersey male actors
10
William Villiers, 10th Earl of Jersey
British male television actors
Earls in the Jacobite peerage
Viscounts Grandison
People educated at Mount House School, Tavistock
Jersey